The Twentieth Amendment (Amendment XX) to the United States Constitution moved the beginning and ending of the terms of the president and vice president from March4 to January 20, and of members of Congress from March4 to January 3. It also has provisions that determine what is to be done when there is no president-elect. The Twentieth Amendment was adopted on January 23, 1933.

The amendment reduced the presidential transition and the "lame duck" period, by which members of Congress and the president serve the remainder of their terms after an election. The amendment established congressional terms to begin before presidential terms and that the incoming Congress, rather than the outgoing one, would hold a contingent election if the Electoral College deadlocked regarding either the presidential or vice presidential elections.

Text

Historical background

Original text of the Constitution
Article I, Section 4, Clause2 of the Constitution states that Congress must meet at least once a year. The default date specified is the first Monday in December, though Congress is empowered to set another date and the president can summon special sessions.

The original text of the Constitution set a duration for the terms of federal elected officials, but not the specific dates on which those terms would begin or end. In September 1788, after the necessary nine states had ratified the Constitution, the Congress of the Confederation set March 4, 1789, as the date "for commencing proceedings" of the newly reorganized government. Despite the fact that the new Congress and presidential administration did not begin operation until April, March4 was deemed to be the beginning of the newly elected officials' terms of office, and thus of the terms of their successors. The Constitution did not specify a date for federal elections, but by the time of the second presidential election in 1792, Congress had passed a law requiring presidential electors to be chosen during November or early December. By 1845, this was narrowed to a single day, in early November. Congressional elections were generally held on the same day.

Issues
The result of these scheduling decisions was that there was a long, four-month lame duck period between the election and inauguration of the new president. For Congress, the situation was perhaps even more awkward. Because Article I, Section 4, Clause2 mandated a Congressional meeting every December, after the election but before Congressional terms of office had expired, a lame-duck session was required by the Constitution in even-numbered years; the next session was not required until the next December, meaning new members of Congress might not begin their work until more than a year after they had been elected. Special sessions sometimes met earlier in the year, but this never became a regular practice, despite the Constitution allowing for it. In practice, Congress usually met in a long session beginning in Decembers of odd-numbered years, and in a short lame-duck session in December of even-numbered years.

The long lame-duck period might have been a practical necessity at the end of the 18th century, when any newly elected official might require several months to put his affairs in order and then undertake an arduous journey from his home to the national capital, but it eventually had the effect of impeding the functioning of government in the modern age. From the early 19th century, it also meant a lame-duck Congress and presidential administration would fail to adequately respond to a significant national crisis in a timely manner. Each institution could do this on the theory that, at best, a lame-duck Congress or administration had neither the time nor the mandate to tackle problems, whereas the incoming administration or Congress would have both the time and a fresh electoral mandate, to examine and address the problems the nation faced. These problems very likely would have been at the center of the debate of the just-completed election cycle.

This dilemma was seen most notably in 1861 and 1933, after the elections of Abraham Lincoln and Franklin D. Roosevelt, respectively, plus the newly elected Senators and Representatives. Under the Constitution at the time, these presidents had to wait four months before they and the incoming Congresses could deal with the secession of Southern states and the Great Depression respectively.

In 1916, during World War I, President Woodrow Wilson devised an unorthodox plan to avoid a lame-duck presidency and allow his Republican opponent Charles Evans Hughes to assume presidential powers immediately if Hughes had won the election. In that case, Wilson planned to appoint Hughes as Secretary of State, who under the Presidential Succession Act of 1886 was second in the presidential line of succession. President Wilson and Vice President Thomas R. Marshall would have then both resigned, leaving Hughes to become acting president. The plan was never implemented because Wilson was narrowly re-elected.

Proposal and ratification

The 72nd Congress proposed the Twentieth Amendment on March 2, 1932, and the amendment was ratified by the following states. The Amendment was adopted on January 23, 1933 after 36 states, being three-fourths of the then-existing 48 states, ratified the Amendment.

Virginia: March 4, 1932
New York: March 11, 1932
Mississippi: March 16, 1932
Arkansas: March 17, 1932
Kentucky: March 17, 1932
New Jersey: March 21, 1932
South Carolina: March 25, 1932
Michigan: March 31, 1932
Maine: April 1, 1932
Rhode Island: April 14, 1932
Illinois: April 21, 1932
Louisiana: June 22, 1932
West Virginia: July 30, 1932
Pennsylvania: August 11, 1932
Indiana: August 15, 1932
Texas: September 7, 1932
Alabama: September 13, 1932
California: January 4, 1933
North Carolina: January 5, 1933
North Dakota: January 9, 1933
Minnesota: January 12, 1933
Arizona: January 13, 1933
Montana: January 13, 1933
Nebraska: January 13, 1933
Oklahoma: January 13, 1933
Kansas: January 16, 1933
Oregon: January 16, 1933
Delaware: January 19, 1933
Washington: January 19, 1933
Wyoming: January 19, 1933
Iowa: January 20, 1933
South Dakota: January 20, 1933
Tennessee: January 20, 1933
Idaho: January 21, 1933
New Mexico: January 21, 1933
Missouri: January 23, 1933This satisfied the requirement for three-fourths of the then-existing 48 states. The amendment was subsequently ratified by:
Georgia: January 23, 1933
Ohio: January 23, 1933
Utah: January 23, 1933
Massachusetts: January 24, 1933
Wisconsin: January 24, 1933
Colorado: January 24, 1933
Nevada: January 26, 1933
Connecticut: January 27, 1933
New Hampshire: January 31, 1933
Vermont: February 2, 1933
Maryland: March 24, 1933
Florida: April 26, 1933

Effects
Section 1 of the Twentieth Amendment prescribes that the start and end of the four-year term of both the president and vice president shall be at noon on January 20. The change superseded the Twelfth Amendment's reference to March4 as the date by which the House of Representatives must—under circumstances where no candidate won an absolute majority of votes for president in the Electoral College—conduct a contingent presidential election. The new date reduced the period between election day in November and Inauguration Day, the presidential transition, by about six weeks. Section1 also specifies noon January 3 as the start and end of the terms of members of the Senate and the House of Representatives; the previous date had also been March 4.

Section 2 moves the yearly start date of congressional sessions from the first Monday in December, as mandated by Article I, Section 4, Clause 2, to noon on January3 of the same year, though Congress still can by law set another date and the president can summon special sessions. This change eliminated the extended lame duck congressional sessions. As a result of this change, if the Electoral College vote has not resulted in the election of either a president or vice president, the incoming Congress, as opposed to the outgoing one, would conduct a contingent election, following the process set out in the Twelfth Amendment.

Section 3 further refines the Twelfth Amendment by declaring that if the president-elect dies before Inauguration Day, the vice president-elect will be sworn in as president on that day and serve for the full four-year term to which that person was elected. It further states that if, on Inauguration Day, a president-elect has not yet been chosen, or if the president-elect fails to qualify, the vice president-elect would become acting president on Inauguration Day until a president-elect is chosen or the president-elect qualifies; previously, the Constitution did not stipulate what was to be done if the Electoral College attempted to elect a constitutionally unqualified person as president.

Section3 also authorizes Congress to determine who should be acting president if a new president and vice president have not been chosen by Inauguration Day. Acting on this authority, Congress added "failure to qualify" as a possible condition for presidential succession in the Presidential Succession Act of 1947. The constitution had previously been silent on this point, and this lack of guidance nearly caused constitutional crises on two occasions: when the House of Representatives seemed unable to break the deadlocked election of 1800, and when Congress seemed unable to resolve the disputed election of 1876. 

Section 4 permits Congress to statutorily clarify what should occur if either the House of Representatives must elect the president, and one of the candidates from whom it may choose dies, or if the Senate must elect the vice president and one of the candidates from whom it may choose dies. Congress has never enacted such a statute.

Effect on the terms of elected officials
On February 15, 1933, 23 days after the amendment was adopted, President-elect Roosevelt was the target of an assassination attempt by Giuseppe Zangara. While Roosevelt was not injured, had the attempt been successful, then Vice President-elect John Nance Garner would have become president on March 4, 1933 pursuant to Section 3.

Section 5 delayed Sections 1 and 2 taking effect until the first October 15 following the amendment's ratification. As it was adopted on January 23, 1933, Section 1 shortened the terms of representatives elected to the 73rd Congress (1933–1935), as well as those of senators elected for terms ending in 1935, 1937, and 1939, by 60 days, by ending those terms on January 3 of each odd-numbered year rather than the March 4 date on which those terms originally were due to expire. Section 5 also resulted in the 73rd Congress not being required to meet until January 3, 1934. 

The first Congress to open its first session and begin its members' terms on the new date was the 74th Congress in 1935. The first presidential and vice presidential terms to begin on the date appointed by the Twentieth Amendment were the second terms of President Roosevelt and Vice President Garner, on January 20, 1937. As Section 1 had shortened the first term of both (1933–1937) by 43 days, Garner thus served as vice-president for two full terms, but he did not serve a full eight years: his vice presidency spanned from March 4, 1933, to January 20, 1941.

References

External links

CRS Annotated Constitution: Twentieth Amendment

Twentieth Amendment to the United States Constitution
1933 in American politics
72nd United States Congress
73rd United States Congress
Amendments to the United States Constitution
United States presidential succession
Presidency of the United States
Vice presidency of the United States